Nigel Grant Douglas (born September 1970) is a Scottish entrepreneur and the founder and former CEO of Global Surface Intelligence Ltd

Before going into business Nigel played sport at a high level. He is a black belt at judo and played rugby union for Scottish Schools, premier division rugby for Dundee HSRFP and district rugby for North and Midlands.

Nigel's father John Douglas was a Scottish Rugby Union international and a British Lion No 8. His grandfather was Alexander H Brown who played stand-off for Scotland and his brother, Struan, played Rugby league for Scotland. Nigel's mother founded the Patricia Brown who founded Patricia Brown School of Dancing. In 2010 she received an MBE for her services to dance.

References 

1970 births
Living people
North and Midlands players
Scottish chief executives